National Institute of Oceanography may refer to:

 National Institute of Oceanography, India
 National Institute of Oceanography (Pakistan)
 National Institute of Oceanography (Great Britain): National Oceanography Centre
 National Oceanography Centre, Southampton, one branch of the National Oceanography Centre
 Institute of Ocean Sciences, BC, Canada

See also
 
 National Institute (disambiguation)
 Oceanography
 Oceanographic Institute (disambiguation)